Riudoms is a town in the comarca of  Baix Camp, province of Tarragona, in Catalonia, located about five kilometres from the regional capital Reus.

The main product is the hazelnut, today in recession, and extra virgin olive oil.

History 

Riudoms was a Roman rural settlement (some archaeological remains and coins were discovered), that was depopulated when the Muslims dominated the region in the 8th century. Conquered by the Norman Robert d'Aguiló under the orders of the Catalan count, the lordship of Riudoms was granted to Arnau de Palomar on 24 January 1150. A castle was constructed and a town born at side.

This village is considered by some the birthplace of the architect Antoni Gaudí, designer of the Sagrada Família church in Barcelona and the most famous creator of the artistic movement known as Modernisme.

References

External links
Riudoms Council
 Government data pages 

Municipalities in Baix Camp
Populated places in Baix Camp